John Winton Brown (born in May 1946) is a Scottish football commentator. He also served as general manager of Scottish club Celtic from 1997 to 1998.

Early life
Brown was born in Kilmarnock in May 1946. He is the younger brother of former Scotland and Aberdeen F.C. manager Craig Brown. His other brother Bob was the Minister at Queen's Cross Parish Church in Aberdeen from 1984 until his retirement in 2008.

He was a supporter of Hamilton Academical as a child, attended the former Hamilton Academy and played in the school's football teams. He later graduated in law from Sidney Sussex College, Cambridge. He is a Cambridge University football Blue, having played three times against Oxford at Wembley, captaining the team on the third occasion.

Legal career
Brown is a solicitor by profession. He was a partner with Brodies LLP until 2010, and subsequently a consultant there until he retired in 2016.

Broadcasting
Brown started his broadcasting career for BBC Radio Scotland before moving to Scottish Television where he became the main commentator between 1980 and 1990. He then joined BBC Scotland where he stayed until 1997. He has also commentated for Sky Sports, Setanta Sports, NTL, ITV on Digital, and News UK Ltd.

Celtic 
In 1997, he was appointed General Manager of Celtic by Fergus McCann. Brown was involved in bringing Wim Jansen to Celtic as manager. Reports suggested that the pair did not enjoy a harmonious working relationship, culminating in the resignation of Jansen after one successful season. Brown was then involved in the appointment of Josef Venglos. Brown had a controversial time at Celtic, and he resigned in November 1998. He is the author of a book on his time at Celtic called Celtic Minded: 510 Days in Paradise.

Charity
From 2013 to 2018 he was chairman of the board of trustees of CU Trust Scotland, which operates Children's University in Scotland; he remains on the board as a trustee.

References 

1946 births
Living people
Celtic F.C. non-playing staff
Scottish association football commentators
Scottish solicitors
People educated at Hamilton Academy
Alumni of Sidney Sussex College, Cambridge
Sportspeople from Hamilton, South Lanarkshire